House of Gold & Bones, the comic, is a limited edition four-issue mini-series created by writer Corey Taylor.

Premise

The series is published by Dark Horse Comics and is just one of several parts of the multi-faced transmedia narrative which collectively unravels the original story-based concept. Taylor's band Stone Sour based their two-part concept album House of Gold & Bones on the series, which express the story via a lyrical/musical avenue. The comic series is more telling and obvious in its presentation of an actual plot line for the House of Gold & Bones, introducing specific characters and delving into the concepts and ideas which the double album and other media outlets have so far, merely "hinted" at, yet have not exposed any substantial concrete imagery or a definitive plot line.

Issues

Each issue is scheduled to be released  in an original and alternate pressing, distinguished by cover art/artist.

House Of Gold & Bones (Issue #1) was released on April 17, 2013. Its original cover art was drawn by artist Jason Shawn Alexander, while the "variant cover" was done by artist Richard Clark.

House Of Gold & Bones (Issue #2) was released on May 22, 2013, and again featured original cover art by Jason Shawn Alexander, with a variant cover by Kyle Hotz.

Film adaption
At a signing Corey Taylor revealed that he has plans to turn the double album into a film; "Once we’ve toured and we’ve got the music out to everyone, the thing I really wanna do is have two movies — Part 1 and Part 2. With the comic and the story and the music, I think we’ll be able to do it. I already know who I wanna talk to about doing it, so we’ll see what happens."

Taylor has further said that he is looking at his and Shawn Crahan's new film production company Living Breathing Films to make the film.

See also
 House of Gold & Bones (disambiguation)
 Corey Taylor
 Dark Horse Comics

References

2013 comics debuts
Dark Horse Comics limited series